Elgin East was a federal electoral district represented in the House of Commons of Canada from 1867 to 1925. It was located in the province of Ontario. It was created by the British North America Act of 1867 which divided the county of Elgin into two ridings: Elgin East and Elgin West based on a traditional division.

In 1882, the East Riding of the county of Elgin was defined as consisting of the townships of Yarmouth, Malahide and Bayham, the villages of Port Stanley, Aylmer and Vienna, and the city of St. Thomas.

In 1903, the riding was redefined to exclude the township of Malahide and the city of St. Thomas, and to include the townships of Dorchester South and Malahide, and the village of Springfield.

The electoral district was abolished in 1924 when it was redistributed between Elgin West and Norfolk—Elgin ridings.

Election results

|}

|}

On Mr. Harvey's death, 14 June 1874:

|}

|}

|}

|}

|}

On election being declared void:

|}

|}

|}

|}

On Mr. Ingram's resignation, 8 December 1906, because of his appointment as Vice Chairman of the Ontario Railway and Municipal Commission:

|}

|}

|}

|}

On Mr. Marshall's death, 14 February 1920:

|-
  
|National Liberal and Conservative
|STANSELL, John Lawrence 
|align="right"| 2,850    

|}

|}

See also 

 List of Canadian federal electoral districts
 Past Canadian electoral districts

References

External links 
Riding history from the Library of Parliament

Former federal electoral districts of Ontario